Banana Bag & Bodice is a Brooklyn-based ensemble theatre company that creates original plays with a strong emphasis on text, music and design. They have performed at the Ontological-Hysteric Theater, PS 122, The Brick Theater, Abrons Arts Center, American Repertory Theater, Joe's Pub, and festivals in San Francisco, New York City, Montreal, Dublin, Edinburgh, and Adelaide.

Company history
Founded in 1999 in San Francisco by Co-Artistic Directors Jason Craig and Jessica Jelliffe, Banana Bag & Bodice have created ten original productions. The group is now based in Brooklyn NY, but maintains a strong relationship to the San Francisco Bay Area community.

Their rock musical Beowulf - A Thousand Years of Baggage, commissioned by the Shotgun Players, won the 2008 Will Glickman Award and a 2011 Edinburgh Festival Herald Angel, and continues to tour internationally.

Works

The Bastard Chronicles (1999)
A compendium of oddities

Number 2 (2000)
A drama about death and remembrance

GULAG HA HA (2002)
A study on prison deformation

Sandwich (2003)
A musical about killing animals

The Young War (2003)
A panel discussion on the death of love

Panel.Animal (2005)
A double feature of The Young War and Sandwich

The Sewers (2005)
An aborted living room drama play

The Fall & Rise of The Rising Fallen (2007)
A "making the band" pageant play

Beowulf- A Thousand Years Of Baggage (2008)
A Banana Bag & Bodice SongPlay

Space//Space (2009)
A claustrophobic container tale

Artists

Jason Craig (Co-Founder/Co-Artistic Director/Writer/Performer) 
  	 
Jessica Jelliffe (Co-Founder/Co-Artistic Director/Performer)
  	 
Peter Blomquist (Performer)

Mallory Catlett (Director/Dramaturg)

Miranda k Hardy (Lighting Designer)

Rod Hipskind (Director/Performer)

Dave Malloy (Composer/Sound Designer/Performer)

Heather Peroni (Performer)

Zbigniew Bzymek (Video Artist for Space//Space)

References

External links
 

Off-Off-Broadway
Musical theatre companies
American artist groups and collectives
Performance art in New York City
Performing groups established in 1999
1999 establishments in California
Theatre Ensemble in New York City